Riverside Farm, also known as Evermay-on-the-Delaware, is a historic hotel located near Erwinna, Tinicum Township, Bucks County, Pennsylvania. The house is a 3 1/2-story, six bay, frame vernacular dwelling with Greek Revival and Italianate style influences.  The oldest section of the main house was built in the late 18th century as a two-story, three bay frame structure. Additions to the house occurred between about 1870 and 1883, when it took its present form.  A stairwell addition was built in 1982.  The front facade features a one-story, flat roofed porch.  Also on the property are a contributing tenant house, carriage house, shed, and ice house.  The house was built as a private dwelling, then converted for use as a hotel and resort starting about 1870.  It operated as an inn until 1930. It reopened in 1982 as a bed-and-breakfast known as EverMay On-The-Delaware. But was closed in 2005 and now operates as a private residence.

It was added to the National Register of Historic Places in 1988.

References

External links
InnSite.com: EverMay On-The-Delaware, Erwinna, Pennsylvania

Bed and breakfasts in Pennsylvania
Hotel buildings on the National Register of Historic Places in Pennsylvania
Greek Revival houses in Pennsylvania
Italianate architecture in Pennsylvania
Houses completed in 1883
Houses in Bucks County, Pennsylvania
National Register of Historic Places in Bucks County, Pennsylvania